Daniel is an English department store chain and Royal Warrant holder, with its flagship store situated in central Windsor. It was established in 1901 by Walter James Daniel, and is privately owned. The store is the largest department store in Windsor and also contains four restaurants, including Heidi and YO! Sushi.

Department store locations
Ealing
Chiswick
Windsor

Former locations
Cardiff
Ebbw Vale
Newbury
Reading
Slough

References

External links
 danielstores.co.uk

Buildings and structures in Windsor, Berkshire
Department stores of the United Kingdom